An album by the band Lady Pank.
Released: Polskie Nagrania Muza SX 2286 (1986)

Musicians
Jan Borysewicz - guitar
Janusz Panasewicz - vocal
Edmund Stasiak - guitar
Paweł Mścisławski - bass, design concept
Andrzej Dylewski - drums
Guest:
Zbigniew Namysłowski - saxophones
Janusz Skowron - keyboards 
Urszula Mogielnicka - backing vocals

Personnel
Engineers:  Andrzej Lupa, Andrzej Sasin, Wojciech Przybylski

Management: Wojciech Kwapisz

Songs

Side A 
 "Made in Homo"
 "Ludzie z Marsa"
 "Babilon Disko Najt"
 "Pierwsza linia"

Side B 
 "Oh, Luczija!"
 "Całe życie"
 "Osobno"
 "Twój normalny stan"
 "Nigdy nie za wiele rokendrola"

Music By: Jan Borysewicz

Lyrics By : Andrzej Mogielnicki

1986 albums
Lady Pank albums